The MasterCard Classic was a golf tournament on the Champions Tour from 2000 to 2004. It was played in late February/early March in Mexico, first in Puebla for two years and then in the Mexico City area. It was the first Champions Tour event in Mexico.

The purse for the 2004 tournament was US$2,000,000, with $300,000 going to the winner. The tournament was founded in 2000 as the Audi Senior Classic.

Winners
2004 Ed Fiori
2003 David Eger

Audi Senior Classic
2002 Bruce Lietzke

Mexico Senior Classic
2001 Mike McCullough

Audi Senior Classic
2000 Hubert Green

Source:

References

See also
MasterCard Classic - an LPGA Tour event in Mexico

Former PGA Tour Champions events
Golf tournaments in Mexico
Recurring sporting events established in 2000
Recurring sporting events disestablished in 2004
2000 establishments in Mexico
2004 disestablishments in Mexico